U with double acute (Ӳ ӳ; italics: Ӳ ӳ) is a letter of the Cyrillic script, derived from the Cyrillic letter U (У у У у).

U with double acute is used in the alphabet of the Chuvash language, where it represents the close front rounded vowel , the pronunciation of the Latin letter U with umlaut (Ü ü) in German. It is usually romanized as ⟨Ü⟩ but its ISO 9 transliteration is ⟨Ű⟩.

Computing codes

See also
Ӱ ӱ : Cyrillic letter U with diaeresis
Ү ү : Cyrillic letter Ue
Ű ű : Latin letter U with double acute - a Hungarian letter

References

Chuvash language
Cyrillic letters with diacritics